This list of city nicknames in Indonesia compiles the aliases, sobriquets, and slogans that cities are known by (or have been known by historically), officially and unofficially, to municipal governments, local people, outsiders or their tourism boards.

Sumatra

Aceh
Banda Aceh
Serambi Mekkah (The Porch of Mecca)
Lhokseumawe
Petrodollar City
Gas City
Sabang
Kilometre zero of Indonesia
Kota Seribu Benteng (City of a Thousand Forts)
Subulussalam
City of Worship
Tapaktuan
Dragon City

Lampung
Bandar Lampung
City of Elephants
Your Second Home

North Sumatra
Berastagi
Town of Passion Fruit
Binjai
City of Rambutans
Kabanjahe
Town of Hills
Town of Oranges
Medan
Capital of Sumatera
City of Thousand Angkots
Kota Melayu Deli (City of Melayu Deli)
Gotham City
Hub of Western Indonesia
Parijs van Sumatra
Pangururan
Indonesische Great Lake (Indonesian Great Lake)
Sidikalang
Town of Salaks
Tanjungbalai
City of Clams
Tebing Tinggi
City of Plantation

Riau
Dumai
Port City
Pekanbaru
City of Good Fortune

Riau Islands
Batam
The Industrial City
The Business City

South Sumatra
Palembang
Kota Pempek (City of Pempek)
Bumi Sriwijaya (The Land of Srivijaya)

West Sumatra
Bukittinggi
City of Tri Arga
City of Jam Gadang
City of Tourism
Padang
Kota Tercinta (Beloved City)
The Porch of Medina

Java

Banten
Cilegon
City of Steel
Pandeglang
City of Rhinos
Serang
City of Santri
Tangerang
City of Factories

Jakarta
Kota Metropolitan (Metropolitan City)
Big Durian
Enjoy Jakarta
J-Town

Central Java
Blora
City of Satay
Demak
City of Wali
Jepara
Bumi Kartini
The World Carving Center
The Beauty of Java
Klaten
The Shine of Java
Kudus
City of Kretek
The Taste of Java
Lasem
City of Chinese
Magelang
City of Getuk
City of Hope
City of Retirement
Pekalongan
City of Batik
Purbalingga
City of Kayak
Purwokerto
City of Kripik
Education City
Knight City
Transit City
Purworejo
City of Scouting
Semarang
Pesona Asia (Charm of Asia)
City of Lumpia
City of Jamu
Venetië van Java (Venice of Java)
Surakarta
City of Culture
City of Liwet
Capital of Batik
The Spirit of Java
Tegal
Ocean City

East Java
Bangkalan
City of Cows
Batu
Agropolis
Bojonegoro
City of Teak
Jember
Land of Beauty
Magetan
The Nice of Java
Kediri
City of Tofu
Lamongan
City of Soto
Malang
Kota Apel (City of Apples)
Military City
Pacitan
City of 1001 Caves
Ponorogo
City of Reog
Surabaya
Sparkling Surabaya
Kota Pahlawan (City of Heroes)
City of Crocodiles
Tuban
Bumi Wali (City of Saints)
City of 1000 Caves
Toak City
The Mid-East of Java

West Java
Bandung
City of Creativity
City of Fashion
Kota Kembang (City of Flowers)
Everlasting Beauty
Parijs van Java (Paris of Java)
Bekasi
City of the Patriots
City of Pancasila
Bogor
Kota Hujan (City of Rain)
City of Pakuan Padjajaran
Kota Seribu Angkot (City of a Thousand Angkots)
Cianjur
City of Rooster
Cikampek
Industrial City
Cikarang
Detroit van Java
Indonesia's Automotive City
Cimahi
Cyber City
Cirebon
City of Prawns
Garut
City of Dodol
City of Sheeps
Indramayu
City of Mangoes
Karawang
Pangkal Perjuangan (The Base of Struggle)
Majalengka
Windy City
Subang
City of Lions
Sukabumi
City of Santri
Sumedang
City of Tofu

Yogyakarta
Yogyakarta
City of Artistry
City of Gudeg
City of Scholars
Kota Pelajar (City of Students)
Never Ending Asia

Lesser Sunda Islands

Bali
Denpasar
City of Children
Ubud
Cultural Capital of Bali
City of Arts

West Nusa Tenggara
Mataram
City of Thousand Mosques
Water City

East Nusa Tenggara
Labuan Bajo
City of Dragons
Kupang
Kota Kasih (City of Love)
Oelmasi
City of Stone Mountains
Ruteng
City of a Thousand Churches
City of Horses

Kalimantan

East Kalimantan
Balikpapan
Kota Minyak (Oil City)
Bontang
Garden City
Samarinda
Queen of Mahakam
Tarakan
Little Singapore
Tenggarong
City of Kings

Central Kalimantan
Palangkaraya
Beautiful City

South Kalimantan
Banjarmasin
City of a Thousand Rivers
Venice of Nusantara
Martapura
City of Diamond

West Kalimantan
Pontianak
Kota Khatulistiwa (Equator City)
Putussibau
Heart of Borneo
Singkawang
City of a Thousand Temples
City of Amoy

Sulawesi

Central Sulawesi
Toli-toli
City of Cloves

Gorontalo
Gorontalo
Serambi Madinah (The Veranda of Medina)

North Sulawesi
Manado
Kota Tinutuan (City of Tinutuan)
City of Waving Palm Trees
Tomohon
City of Flowers

South Sulawesi
Bulukumba
City of Pinisi
Makassar
Great Expectation
Kota Daeng (City of Daeng)
City of Angin Mamiri

Southeast Sulawesi
Baubau
Bumi Semerbak (Land of Fragrance)
City of Pineapples

Maluku Islands and Western New Guinea

Maluku
Ambon
Ambon Manise
Music City
Tual
City of Pearl

North Maluku
Ternate
City of Spices
City of Forts

Papua
Biak
City of Reefs
Jayapura
City of Black Pearl
Merauke
City of Deers

West Papua
 Raja Ampat
 The Paradise of Papua
Fakfak
City of Nutmeg
Sorong
Oil City

See also

 Lists of nicknames – nickname list articles on Wikipedia

References

Indonesia
City nicknames

ms:Senarai nama samaran kota di Indonesia